Michelle Quibell (born April 23, 1984 in Atlanta) is a professional squash player who represented The United States. She was a four-year member of Yale's women's squash squad during a period of unprecedented success for the program. She reached a career-high world ranking of World No. 103 in March 2005. Quibell was the two-time NCAA Division 1 Champion.

Quibell graduated in 2006 from Yale University with a degree in Environmental Studies and graduated in 2011 with a dual MBA / Master of Environmental Science degree from the University of Michigan.

References

External links 

American female squash players
Living people
1984 births
Squash players at the 2007 Pan American Games
Ross School of Business alumni
Pan American Games silver medalists for the United States
Pan American Games medalists in squash
Medalists at the 2007 Pan American Games
21st-century American women